Formal consensus refers to a specific organizational structure which formalizes both the relationships between members of an organization and the processes through which they interact to create an environment in which consensus decision-making can occur in a specific, consistent, and efficient manner.  While many diverse consensus decision-making techniques exist, formal consensus emphasizes the concept that the particular process by which a decision is made is equally significant to gaining consensus as the content of any proposal or discussion.

Main principles
Formal consensus is designed to structurally identify and isolate issues regarding the process by which interactions occur, to prevent these issues from interfering with the content of any particular interaction.  This is accomplished through dedicating time and effort to developing (by consensus) a procedural structure for any discussion prior to beginning the actual discussion.  A common example of this is seen in the relationship between agenda planning meetings and content meetings; the purpose of the agenda planning meeting is to establish an exact agenda for the content meeting, outlining not only which topics will be discussed, but who will lead the discussion, what other roles are needed in the discussion, how long the discussion should take, whether or not a decision is needed, and how any decisions should be reached.  Once a detailed structural process has been established, those involved in the content meeting will enjoy greater freedom to engage in the material being discussed, as well as greater efficiency in achieving consensus.

The concept of formulating specific and consistent procedural structures must begin at the very foundation of an organization, if formal consensus is to be successfully implemented.  Organizations intending to use formal consensus must establish the fundamental principles, values, and goals that all the members of the organization have in common.  Once this is established, any conflicts which arise based on basic principles can always refer back to the agreed-upon set of common values.  It is only after this foundational agreement has been achieved that particular structures and relationships can be developed through consensus decision-making.  Clearly, the exact implementation of formal consensus will vary from one organization to the next, based on the needs, goals, values, and resources of the organization.  However, the basic concept remains: once a specific and consistent procedural structure is developed, from the most basic level upward, all subsequent decision-making processes will be both efficient and predictable, which will provide known opportunities for even those who feel less empowered to participate in the decision-making process.

It is important to note that formal consensus aims to apply this process-content distinction to all types of organizational interaction.  Decision making is one particular type of interaction, but these structural concepts can also be applied to meeting management, facilitation of discussion, and conflict resolution.

Advantages and disadvantages 
The main advantage of formal consensus over more traditional decision-making practices is that it diminishes the competitive dynamic which is integral to all majority rule systems.  Formal consensus emphasizes universal participation through inclusive, open, and transparent procedures which encourage cooperative resolution to conflicts, rather than aggressive competition to achieve the highest number of votes.

The predictable and consistent structure which formal consensus provides allows for easier participation, even from those participants who would otherwise feel marginalized or disempowered.

Additionally, the consensus decision making process implies that once a proposal is accepted, it has been modified to suit the needs of all members of an organization.  By default, any proposal which is accepted has the support of the entire organization, and any dissent is already public knowledge.  This type of decision making process allows for the most direct, efficient implementation of any given proposal.

A disadvantage to the formal consensus model is that participation requires a deep, common understanding of the underlying agreements which form the structure and process through which decisions are made.  On account of this need, it may be difficult for new people to enter an existing organization and participate to their full capacity.

Structure of formal consensus
The general structure of a decision reached by formal consensus should resemble the following:

Introduction 
When a proposal or issue is raised, it should be submitted to the group, and sufficient time should be given for all participants to familiarize themselves with the proposal.  The process by which the proposal / issue originated should be clarified, and any clarifying questions should be addressed.

First level of discussion 
Once the proposal is understood by all participants, a broad discussion of the overall merits and drawbacks of the proposal should take place.  None of the conflicts or concerns that are raised at this phase are directly addressed, and no questions are directly resolved.  Instead, all comments are noted, and the discussion is made to move forward without dwelling on particular concerns.  Some proposals can be accepted or rejected at this stage.  It is appropriate to call for consensus here.

Second level of discussion 
Specific concerns and conflicts which came from the general discussion of the proposal are identified.  No attempt is made to resolve these concerns, but instead, all of the specific conflicts and concerns which require discussion are identified and formulated into specific points.

Third level of discussion 
The specific conflicts identified in the second level are discussed, one at a time.  Each concern is discussed until a resolution is achieved.

There are alternative means of resolving a discussion which cannot achieve consensus, which include sending the proposal to a committee, or conducting a super-majority vote.

Roles
Roles are central to the formal consensus model, but it is important to understand that each role is a function of the process of a meeting, and not a function of the content.  Not all roles are needed at every meeting, and when appropriate, more than one role can be held by the same individual.

Agenda planners 
Prior to any meeting, an agenda planning meeting should first be conducted by a small group of agenda planners.  The tasks which agenda planners must carry out include collecting agenda items, arranging items into a comprehensive agenda, assigning presenters for each topic, determining the discussion techniques to be employed, assigning time limits to each topic, and finally drafting a written version of the finalized agenda.  Decisions on each of these tasks should be achieved through consensus.

Facilitator 
A facilitator is an individual responsible for ensuring that a meeting flows smoothly, and that discussion is facile.  The facilitator is responsible for moving through the agenda in the time determined by the agenda planners.  In being responsible for this, the facilitator must guide the process of the discussion and suggest techniques for resolving conflicts which arise.  However, the facilitator is only responsible for providing direction on the process of the meeting, and should not participate in the content of the discussions.

Timekeeper 
This is the individual responsible for assisting the facilitator in maintaining the pre-determined time limitations for each discussion.

Public scribe 
The scribe also assists the facilitator, by putting major discussion points or concerns immediately relevant to the topic at hand in writing for the entire group to see.  This role is helpful in allowing the group to visually keep track of points that have been raised.

Note Taker 
This individual is responsible for developing and distributing a detailed written record of any given meeting.  These notes are useful in allowing absent members to maintain their participation in ongoing discussions, as well as for future reference.

Doorkeeper 
The doorkeeper is responsible for informing all participants who enter a meeting of all pertinent information, distributing relevant literature (agenda, etc.), and briefly informing latecomers of what topics have been covered.

Scale
The importance of structural agreements and formalized process become more critical as the group of participants increases.  A small organization may be able to afford more flexibility in their process, but a group of several hundred or several thousand participants requires a strict procedural structure to ensure that equal opportunity is given for everyone to voice their opinion.

It is possible for a formal consensus model to be employed for decision-making bodies of up to 100,000 participants.  However, this requires that much smaller groups be formed, so that real discussion is made possible.  Ideally, each individual would be able to discuss topics and proposals among an “affinity group" of 5 or 6 people, and each affinity group would then be able to participate in larger-scale discussions by way of a representative.

Examples
The following list includes some organizations which have adopted the formal consensus model:

Alaska Native Health Board
Alexander Technique International
Food Not Bombs
Midwives Association of North America – Executive Committee
On Earth Peace Assemble
Shannon Farm Community
Sojourner House
Takoma Village Co-Housing
Bread and Roses Collective House

Further reading
C. T. Butler and Amy Rothstein, On Conflict and Consensus: A Handbook on Formal Consensus Decisionmaking (Portland, Maine: Food Not Bombs Publishing, 1987).

Organizational theory